"Thinking About You" is a song by Scottish DJ and record producer Calvin Harris, featuring Jordanian singer Ayah Marar. It was released on 2 August 2013 as the eighth and final single from Harris' third studio album, 18 Months (2012). The song was written by Harris and Marar, who previously worked together on Harris's promotional single, "Let Me Know" (2004) and "Flashback" (2009), the third single from his second studio album, Ready for the Weekend.

The song debuted and peaked at number 8 on the UK Singles Chart, giving Harris his ninth UK top 10 single from 18 Months and making him the first artist in history to have nine UK top 10 singles from one album. His record was surpassed in March 2017 by Ed Sheeran, whose third studio album ÷ includes ten top 10 hits.

Chart performance
On 11 August 2013, the song climbed to number 8 in the UK, giving Harris his ninth top-10 hit from 18 Months (counting "We Found Love", on which Harris was listed as a featured artist, as a single from 18 Months)  and breaking his own chart record in the process. On Billboards Dance/Mix Show Airplay chart, the song became his fifth consecutive number one.

Music video
The official music video was uploaded to Harris's Vevo account on 15 July 2013. It was directed by Vincent Haycock and filmed in Los Angeles County off the coast of Santa Catalina Island. Establishing shots of Avalon, California and Santa Catalina Island were used to convey the Somali coast of East Africa. Some additional scenes were filmed in Avalon, specifically the fight scene of the teenage boy, which overlooks the city and Pacific Ocean towards the California mainland. 

The video features a pool party, a rave, a boat party (which Marar is on) being hijacked by Somali pirates, a couple having sex on a plane and a beaten-up teenage boy taking out revenge by badly beating up the guy who did it to him. The video also features an appearance from Hurts member Theo Hutchcraft.

Track listing and formats

Charts and certifications

Weekly charts

Year-end charts

Certifications

Release history

References

2012 songs
2013 singles
Calvin Harris songs
Columbia Records singles
Songs written by Calvin Harris